White rattlesnake may refer to:

 Crotalus mitchellii, a.k.a. the speckled rattlesnake, a venomous pitviper species found in the Southwestern United States, and in northern Mexico
 Crotalus lepidus, a.k.a. the rock rattlesnake, a venomous pitviper species found in the southwestern United States and northern central Mexico

Animal common name disambiguation pages